Bill Taylor (born July 16, 1946) is an American politician. He is a member of the South Carolina House of Representatives from the 86th District, serving since November 8, 2010. He is a member of the Republican party. The 86th district covers nearly two-thirds of Aiken County, South Carolina and consists of a population more than 41,000. Taylor currently is a member of the House Labor, Commerce and Industry Committee. He served for a decade on the House Education and Public Works Committee, and six years on the Legislative Oversight Committee.

Pre-Political Career

Bill Taylor worked in the field of journalism for many years. From 1965 to 1976, Taylor's job varied from being a reporter, news presenter, and news director, in which he would also serve as President of the Illinois News Broadcasters Association, in 1974. Bill would proceed to work as a news consultant for more than 3 decades, in which he would also be the founder and CEO of a media research and consulting firm based in Dallas, Los Angeles, and London, from 1978 to 2007. Most notably, prior to his career in the South Carolina House of Representatives, Bill Taylor would become a consultant to George H. W. Bush from 1991 to 1992, in the Points of Light organization.

Political career

In August 2009, Bill Taylor attended the Leadership Institute's Future Candidate School, located in Arlington, Virginia, where Bill would gain essential, political knowledge. Bill later credited the institution, following his election to the South Carolina House of Representatives, saying "My campaign success was fueled by our enrolling in LI’s Future Candidate’s School; it was a most valuable experience. It’s essential to be as knowledgeable as possible and prepared for the twists and turns of a political campaign. LI smoothed our political road to success." Bill ran for the Republican nomination for the 86th district in the South Carolina House of Representatives, following the announcement of his candidacy, January 2010. On June 8, Taylor won the nomination, beating incumbent, James Stewart Jr., who was seeking his fifth term. Taylor won the election in the safe, Republican district, and currently still holds the seat. Throughout his time in office, Bill's most significant positions included Chairman of the Higher Education Sub-Committee (State House Education & Public Works Committee), from 2015 to present, and Majority Caucus Whip from 2013 to 2016.

Electoral history

2010

2012

2014

2016

2018

References

Living people
1946 births
Republican Party members of the South Carolina House of Representatives
21st-century American politicians